Robert Machin or Machim (fl. 14th century) was an English adventurer of uncertain historicity, who supposedly discovered the island of Madeira. Various traditions give conflicting versions of Machin's story.

In the best-known version the protagonist is a knight, and referred to as the Machim. He was an English aristocrat who traded on the Mediterranean, and fell in love with a woman by the name of Anne d'Arfet. Her original name could have been Dorset, Darbey or Hertford; after the story was transmitted through foreign languages it is no longer clear. Anne was of a higher social standing than Robert, and the two had to elope from the town of Bristol. Their ship is driven away from the coast of France by a storm, and after thirteen days they see the island of Madeira, where they land. At this point, however, Anne dies from exhaustion, and Robert follows her a few days later. The crew of the ship make it to North Africa, where they are captured by the Moors. One of their fellow prisoners, called Morales of Seville, is ransomed and sent back to Castile, but on the way back he is captured by a servant of Prince Henry the Navigator of Portugal. When Prince Henry hears of the story he promptly sends out an expedition that finds the island of Madeira.

This version of the story was supposedly written down by a member of Prince Henry's household, and became the basis for several later versions. It is known to date back at least to 1579. Another tradition is probably older, and can be traced back to 1507. In this version, Machin survives his lover, and builds an oratory over her grave. He makes it off the island and eventually ends up at the royal court of Castile. Finally, a third version tells of a French merchant by the name of il Macino. This adventurer, known from the writings of Giulio Landi, differs from the other two in two senses: he has no mistress, and he later returns to colonise the island.

Though it is unknown whether the story of Machin is true, the island still carries a reminder of him in the name of the city Machico, which supposedly was named after him. It is certain that the discovery of Madeira predates the Portuguese settlement, as it appears on maps as early as 1339. In 1419 João Gonçalves Zarco landed on the island, and colonised it for Portugal.

References

14th-century English people
Legendary English people
Medieval legends
History of Madeira